WFNL may refer to:

 WQDR (AM), a radio station (570 AM) licensed to serve Raleigh, North Carolina, which held the call sign WFNL from 2012 to 2017
 WKJO (FM), a radio station (102.3 FM) licensed to serve Smithfield, North Carolina, which held the call sign WFNL-FM from 2014 to 2015